Vladimir Grigoryevich Savdunin (10 May 1924 – 27 October 2008) was a Soviet professional football and bandy player.

Honours
 Soviet Top League champion: 1945, 1949, 1954, 1955.
 Soviet Top League runner-up: 1946, 1947, 1948, 1950, 1956.
 Soviet Top League bronze: 1952.
 Soviet Cup winner: 1953.
 Soviet Bandy League champion: 1951, 1952.

External links
 

1924 births
Footballers from Moscow
2008 deaths
Soviet footballers
Association football midfielders
Soviet Top League players
FC Dynamo Moscow players
Soviet bandy players
Dynamo Moscow players